Gino Corrado (born Gino Liserani; 9 February 1893 – 23 December 1982) was an Italian-born film actor. He appeared in more than 400 films between 1916 and 1954, almost always in small roles as a character actor. From 1916–1923, he was known as Eugene Corey, which was an Anglicized version of his name.

Career
	
Born in Florence, Italy, Corrado is considered to have one of the most impressive filmographies of any actor; for example, he is the only actor to appear in Gone With The Wind, Citizen Kane and Casablanca, three of the leading films of Hollywood's Golden Age. He played Aramis in The Iron Mask (1929). He made his film debut in D. W. Griffith's Intolerance in 1916, and appeared in such other silent classics as The Ten Commandments and Sunrise. By the time sound arrived, he had already been reduced to a bit player, but worked constantly (making 18 appearances just in 1939) and was always a welcome presence. He is especially known by Three Stooges fans for his appearances in Saved by the Belle, An Ache in Every Stake and Micro-Phonies. His final film role was a shoe salesman in the 1954 Martin and Lewis comedy Living It Up. 

He became a restaurateur following the end of his film career.

Death
Corrado died at the Motion Picture and Television Country House in Woodland Hills, California on December 23, 1982 at age 89. His grave is located at Valhalla Memorial Park Cemetery, and his gravestone epitaph is etched with Corrado's image from the classic Three Stooges short, Micro-Phonies, with the inscription, "Forever On The Screen — Forever In Our Hearts".

Selected filmography

 Gretchen the Greenhorn (1916) - Wedding Guest (uncredited)
 Intolerance (1916) - The Runner (uncredited)
 Forbidden Paths (1917) - A Mexican Flirt (uncredited)
 The Gown of Destiny (1917) - in French Consulate office
 The Flames of Chance (1918) - Anatole
 The Argument (1918) - John Corbin Jr.
 The Velvet Hand (1918)
 The Hopper (1918) - Roger Livingston Talbot
 Restitution (1918) - Adam
 A Roman Scandal (1919, Short)
 The Great Lover (1920) - Secretary
 The Guttersnipe (1922) - Clarence Phillips
 Beyond the Rocks (1922) - Guest at Alpine Inn (uncredited)
 The Ordeal (1922) - Gene
 My American Wife (1922) - Pedro DeGrossa
 Slander the Woman (1923) - Tetreau, the Guide
 Adam's Rib (1923) - Lt. Braschek
 The Spanish Dancer (1923) - Musketeer (uncredited)
 Flaming Youth (1923) - Leo Stenak
 The Ten Commandments (1923) - Israelite Slave (uncredited)
 The Thrill Chaser (1923) - Rudolph Biggeddo
 Men (1924) - The Stranger
 Reckless Speed (1924) - David Brierly
 South of the Equator (1924) - The General
 The Rose of Paris (1924) - Paul Maran
 He Who Laughs Last (1925) - Elwood Harkness
 The Coast Patrol (1925) - Eric Marmont
 The Desert Flower (1925) - José Lee
 Off the Highway (1925) - Rabbitt
 Speed Madness (1925)
 Without Mercy (1925) - Malay Jack (uncredited)
 Away in the Lead (1925)
 Never Too Late (1925) - Count Gaston La Rue
 La Bohème (1926) - Marcel
 The Volga Boatman (1926) - White Army Officer (uncredited)
 Modern Youth (1926)
 The Dead Line (1926) - Juan Álavarez
 The Amateur Gentleman (1926) - Prince Regent
 The Little Firebrand (1926) - Adonis Wenhoff
 Bardelys the Magnificent (1926) - Dueling Husband (uncredited)
 Gigolo (1926) - Hotel Crillon Desk Clerk (uncredited)
 The White Black Sheep (1926) - El Rahib
 Uneasy Payments (1927) - Bozoni
 Paid to Love (1927) - Tour Director (uncredited)
 Sunrise (1927) - Manager of Hair Salon (uncredited)
 Women's Wares (1927) - Modiste
 The Cohens and the Kellys in Paris (1928) - Pierre
 The Devil's Skipper (1928) - Philip La Farge
 The House of Scandal (1928) - Morgan
 The Charge of the Gauchos (1928) - Moreno
 The Gun Runner (1928) - Garcia
 Fazil (1928) - Sultan's Messenger (uncredited)
 Prowlers of the Sea (1928) - The Skipper
 The Rainbow (1929) - Slug
 The Iron Mask (1929) - Aramis
 Tide of Empire (1929) - Carlos Montalvo (uncredited)
 The One Woman Idea (1929) - Bordinnas
 Señor Americano (1929) - Carlos Ramirez
 Navy Blues (1929) - Headwaiter at Garden Cabaret (uncredited)
 Lord Byron of Broadway (1930) - Riccardi
 Those Who Dance (1930) - Tony
 A Notorious Affair (1930) - Serge - Pianist (uncredited)
 The Czar of Broadway (1930) - El Dorado Club Headwaiter (uncredited)
 Song of the Caballero (1930) - Don Jose Madero
 Oh Sailor Behave (1930) - Stephan
 Sin Takes a Holiday (1930) - Dressmaker (uncredited)
 Oh, For a Man! (1930) - Signor Ferrari, Italian Master of Ceremonies (uncredited)
 Kiss Me Again (1931) - Gino - Orchestra Leader in Cafe (uncredited)
 The Last Parade (1931) - Joe
 Always Goodbye (1931) - Italian Policeman (uncredited)
 That's My Line (1931, Short) - Henchman
 The Man from Death Valley (1931) - Ortego
 Possessed (1931) - Signor Martini - Party Guest (uncredited)
 Her Majesty, Love (1931) - Venetian Hotel Clerk (uncredited)
 Cock of the Air (1932) - Banquet Guest (uncredited)
 Hotel Continental (1932) - Waiter (uncredited)
 Scarface (1932) - Waiter at Columbia Cafe (uncredited)
 Careless Lady (1932) - French Hotel Waiter (uncredited)
 This Is the Night (1932) - Manager of Neopolitan Hotel (uncredited)
 Street of Women (1932) - Nightclub Patron (uncredited)
 Love Is a Racket (1932) - Sardi's Waiter (uncredited)
 Trouble in Paradise (1932) - Venetian (uncredited)
 A Farewell to Arms (1932) - Italian Soldier (uncredited)
 The King's Vacation (1933) - Headwaiter (uncredited)
 Hallelujah, I'm a Bum (1933) - Mayor's Chef (uncredited)
 Grand Slam (1933) - Barber (uncredited)
 Obey the Law (1933) - Giovanni
 The White Sister (1933) - Enrico - Guido's Chauffeur (uncredited)
 The Keyhole (1933) - Gino - Hotel Metropole Waiter #2 (uncredited)
 Picture Snatcher (1933) - Barber (uncredited)
 I Loved You Wednesday (1933) - Opera Singing Neighbor (uncredited)
 Laughing at Life (1933) - Don Flavio's Associate (uncredited)
 Voltaire (1933) - Musician in Versailles (uncredited)
 My Woman (1933) - George - Waiter (uncredited)
 Walls of Gold (1933) - 2nd Furrier (uncredited)
 Jimmy and Sally (1933) - 1st Waiter at Club Rendezvous (uncredited)
 Girl Without a Room (1933) - Man at Art Awards (uncredited)
 Flying Down to Rio (1933) - Messenger (uncredited)
 I Am a Thief (1934)
 I Sell Anything (1934)
 Flirting with Danger (1934)
 Paradise Canyon (1935)
 The Widow from Monte Carlo (1935)
 The Great Hotel Murder (1935)
 The Oregon Trail (1936)
 Mr. Deeds Goes to Town (1936)
 Dodsworth (1936)
 Rebellion (1936)
 Beau Geste (1939)
 Rose of the Rio Grande (1938)
 Gone with the Wind (1939) - Minor Role (uncredited)
 Mr. Moto Takes a Vacation (1939)
 Saved by the Belle (1939) - General Casino
 The Grapes of Wrath (1940) - Chef (uncredited)
 Rebecca (1940) - Hotel Manager (uncredited)
 The Mark of Zorro (1940) - Caballero (uncredited)
 An Ache in Every Stake (1941) - Chef
 Affectionately Yours (1941)
 Citizen Kane (1941) - Gino (uncredited)
 Casablanca (1942) - Waiter at Rick's (uncredited)
 Appointment in Berlin (1943)
 Chetniks! The Fighting Guerrillas (1943) - Italian Lieutenant
 House of Frankenstein  (1944)
 Micro-Phonies (1945) - Italian Singer
 Secrets of Monte Carlo (1951)
 Living It Up (1954)

References

Further reading

 Pringle, Kirby T. Waiting on Hollywood: The Tale of an Italian Bit Player. [Dissertation]  Loyola University Chicago. 2015.

External links

Photos of Corrado's restaurant

1893 births
1982 deaths
Italian male film actors
Italian male silent film actors
Actors from Florence
Italian emigrants to the United States
20th-century Italian male actors
Burials at Valhalla Memorial Park Cemetery
20th-century American comedians